Vianania is a genus of moths in the subfamily Arctiinae. The genus was erected by Ricardo N. Orfila in 1954.

Species
 Vianania argentinensis (Rothschild, 1912)
 Vianania australis Orfila, 1935
 Vianania aymara Orfila, 1954

References

Lithosiini